Richie Londres, (born in London, England) is an English record producer, film composer and guitarist. Londres has worked with Deftones and Cypress Hill on various projects. Londres is active in three groups, as the founding member & producer of Sol Invicto, Cultura Londres Proyecto and Okujira. He is Published by Universal Records.

Sol Invicto

Londres is the founder member of underground group Sol Invicto an instrumental cinematic metal/electronic group which features Deftones guitarist Stephen Carpenter & UK drum & bass producer Mark Caro aka Technical Itch and Dan Foord on drums.

Cultura Londres

Early Years 2004–2008

Founded by Londres in 2004 with MC Tiago and Eric Bobo of Cypress Hill. The group toured extensively in the UK from 2006-2008 and released several music videos and released 2 EP's, supporting artists such as Ozomatli, La Mala Rodriguez and Joel Ortiz.

Hiatus 2008 - 2022 

Cultura Londres has been through many musical and line up changes since its conception and enjoyed a great reception from fans around the world but with Tiago's family commitments Londres was forced to shift his focus and started working on his other project Sol Invicto. With Sol Invicto now officially his main project Londres has always hinted at returning to finish the work he started in Cultura Londres. In a recent interview Londres stated "I want to debut the true sound of Cultura, much more in tune with my roots as a musician and producer. I've always been into the heavier, darker side of music, its always been in my heart. I tried all kinds of sounds for Cultura Londres and I've ended up back where I started. It's a journey I think you have to make as an artist to truly know why you do what you do."

Cultura Londres Productions 2022 

Cultura Londres returned in 2022 as Cultura Londres Productions, currently working on a number of scores for film and television for the Latin sector with Universal Latino.

Production

Londres is based in London/NYC & Los Angeles. He is known to use a combination of Logic, Ableton and live instrumentation for production. His influences are cited from Motown to Aphex Twin.

Discography

With Cultura Londres
 "Tiago" (4 track industry sampler) 2004 
 "Todo" (Debut EP) 2007 
 "Escape Inglaterra" (EP) 2009
 "Radio Bootlegs Volume 1" 2011

With Sol Invicto

Private releases only

With Necro Deathmort
 Return To Planet Atlas (Vocals/FX) (2009, Distraction Records.)

With Eric Bobo
 Fiesta (Meeting of the Minds, 2008, Writer/Producer (Nacional Records)
 Todo (Meeting of the Minds, 2008, Writer/Producer (Nacional Records)
 Maestro (Ritmo Machine, 2011, Engineer (Nacional Records)

With Universal
Real Freestyle (La Pasion, 2009, Producer (Universal CHAP347A)
Ignite The Night (La Pasion, 2009, Producer (Universal CHAP347A)
Progressions (La Pasion, 2009, Producer (Universal CHAP347A)

With Okujira
Black Gold (Okujira Tapes, 2013)
King Whale (Okujira Tapes, 2014)
Sick Of Synchronicity (Okujira Tapes, 2014)
Drop To The Floor (Okujira Tapes, 2015)
Omni Ross (Okujira Tapes, 2015)

Remixes
 "Legal Drug Addict (Richie Londres Remix)" Sid Wilson & thekeenone
 "Diamond Eyes – Deftones" (Sol Invicto Remix) 2010 Warner
 "You've Seen The Butcher – Deftones" (Sol Invicto Remix) 2010 Warner
 "Morte Et Dabo – Asking Alexandria" (Sol Invicto Remix) 2011 Sumerian Records
 "Lesson Never Learned – Asking Alexandria" (Sol Invicto Remix) 2011 Sumerian Records

References

http://www.doseofmetal.com/2011/09/interview-richie-londres-sol-invicto/
http://www.latinrapper.com/featurednews55.html
http://deftones.ru/pressa/sol-invicto-exclusive-interview-richie-londres-deftonesru.html
http://www.roadrunnerrecords.com/blabbermouth.net/news.aspx?mode=Article&newsitemID=131972
http://www.noisecreep.com/2010/06/18/sol-invicto-feature-members-of-deftones-cypress-hill-sikth/
http://www.threedworld.com.au/?p=1029
http://www.cargo-london.com/event/odb-sessions-2
http://timesofindia.indiatimes.com/topic/article/019R8U6cmrcPL?q=Sol+Invictus
http://www.discogs.com/artist/Richie+Londres

External links
Official website

Living people
English multi-instrumentalists
English rock guitarists
English songwriters
Musicians from London
Sol Invicto members
Year of birth missing (living people)